Aquanura is the name of a fountain system in the Efteling theme park in the Netherlands. The premiere took place on 31 May 2012 on the park's 60th anniversary, and it opened to the public the following day. The fountain was developed by WET Design, Efteling and Tebodin Consultants & Engineers. The fountain is the largest in Europe and the third largest in the world, after The Dubai Fountain and the Fountains of Bellagio, though it could better be compared as a smaller version of Disney's World of Color.

The show falls within the scope of the Frog King theme. As such, 4 large frog replicas are placed in the pond.

The Fountain
Aquanura has a total of 200 fountains, subdivided in 9 types, each with its own reach and effect. 4 of the types are custom designed and built for this project, as are the light effects.
800 lamps will be placed in the pond, and 29 light- and audio posts are placed around the pond, with Moving heads on top, all in support of the water show.
The super shooters reach a height of 45 meters, well under their listed capacity.

The whole project was constructed by Water Entertainment Technologies (WET), Tebodin Netherlands B.V., Heijmans NV, Kuijpers Piping & Procestechniek, Hoppenbrouwers Elektrotechniek B.V. and Primagaz Nederland B.V. at a total cost of €17,000,000.
The watershow can normally be seen at closing time of the park, extra shows are scheduled on busy days and days with extended opening hours. Since the opening of the original Aquanura, the symphony has changed. It has been remade with a couple of new song added.

Music
The music is a medley of compositions that are in the themes of other rides, performed by The Brabant Orchestra.
 The Magic Clock - By the Sleepy Lagoon (Eric Coates)
 Villa Volta - Main theme (Ruud Bos)
 The Magic Clock - by the sleepy lagoon
 The Indian Water Lilies (Bert Kaempfert)
 Carnival Festival (Toon Hermans)
 Ravelin (René Merkelbach)
 Dream flight - Castle Realm (Ruud Bos)
 Menuet in G (BWV Anh. 114) (Johann Sebastian Bach)
 Haunted Castle - Danse Macabre (Camille Saint-Saëns)

Location
Aquanura is located in the Rowing Pond, thus replacing it, next to the Fata Morgana in the themed area Differ Realm.

See also
 2012 in amusement parks

References

External links 

 Video of the show on Efteling's official Youtube channel, captured from the live stream of the opening as transmitted on Youtube
 Attraction website
 Current show times are published daily at Efteling.com.

Fountains in Europe
Amusement rides introduced in 2012